Greg Conlan (born 16 January 1963) is a former Australian rules footballer who played with Richmond in the Victorian Football League (VFL).

Conlan, who came to Richmond from Nandaly, made six appearances at VFL level. He played in the final four rounds of the 1983 VFL season, then in rounds 15 and 16 the following year.

References

External links
 
 

1963 births
Australian rules footballers from Victoria (Australia)
Richmond Football Club players
Living people